Rear-Admiral Joseph de Richery (13 September 1757 in Allons, Alpes-de-Haute-Provence – 1798 in Allons) was a French naval officer.

Career 
He distinguished himself in the French Navy in the American Revolutionary War.  From 1781 until 1785 he served in the Indian Ocean under Pierre André de Suffren de Saint Tropez.  In 1793 he was promoted to captain and given command of Bretagne, but was relieved during the French Revolution after the Quibéron mutinies. He was reinstated in 1794 and given the rank of rear admiral.

He commanded a squadron of 6 vessels and three frigates based in Toulon during Richery's expedition. These ships were among the small squadrons used by the French to raid British commerce. In one of its remarkable engagements, his squadron captured convoy of trading vessels (around thirty vessels), which the squadron took to Cadiz where it was blockaded by the British.  In 1795, he carried out a raid on Saint-Dominigue and captured another enemy convoy.

Richery also participated in series of conflicts in 1790s with the British in Canada, landing at Bay Bulls on September 1796.  His squadron then carried out raids on the British coasts of Newfoundland. His squadron also bombarded and destroyed English fisheries in the area.

Richery died in Allons in 1798.

Notes and references
References

Bibliography
 

1757 births
1798 deaths
People from Alpes-de-Haute-Provence
French Navy admirals
French Republican military leaders of the French Revolutionary Wars